Fotbal Club Gaz Metan Târgu Mureș was a Romanian football club from Târgu Mureș, Mureș County.

In its history, Gaz Metan has played for eight seasons in Liga III, between 2000 and 2009.

History
Gaz Metan achieved promotion to the Divizia C, Romanian's third division, at the end of the 1999–2000 season, winning Divizia D – Mureș County.

During its first season in Divizia C, 2000–01, coached by Florea Ispir, Gaz Metan enjoying a good form finishing in 2nd place. In the following season, "Mureșenii" finished on the 8th place.

Honours
Liga III:
Runners-up (1): 2000–01

Liga IV – Mureș County
Winners (3): 1999–2000, 2006–07, 2009–10
Runners-up (2): 2010–11, 2012–13

Cupa României – Mureș County
Winners (1): 2010–11

League history

References

External links
Asociaţia Judeţeană de Fotbal Mureş

Association football clubs disestablished in 2018
Defunct football clubs in Romania
Football clubs in Mureș County
Liga III clubs
Liga IV clubs
2018 disestablishments in Romania